When Time Got Louder is a Canadian coming-of-age drama film, directed by Connie Cocchia and released in 2022. The film stars Willow Shields as Abbie, a young woman who experiences independence for the first time when she goes off to college and begins a new romance with Karly (Ava Capri), while still being torn by the need to help her parents, Mark (Lochlyn Munro) and Tish (Elizabeth Mitchell), care for her autistic brother Kayden (Jonathan Michael Simao).

The film debuted at the 2022 Frameline Film Festival, and had its Canadian premiere at the 2022 Vancouver International Film Festival.

References

External links 
 

2022 films
2022 drama films
2022 LGBT-related films
Canadian coming-of-age drama films
Canadian LGBT-related films
Canadian independent films
LGBT-related coming-of-age films
2022 directorial debut films
English-language Canadian films
2020s Canadian films